Members of the New South Wales Legislative Council who served from 1887 to 1889 were appointed for life by the Governor on the advice of the Premier. This list includes members between the elections commencing on 4 February 1887 and the elections commencing on 1 February 1889. The President was Sir John Hay.

Although a loose party system had emerged in the Legislative Assembly at this time, there was no real party structure in the Council.

See also
Fourth Parkes ministry
Second Dibbs ministry

Notes

References

 

Members of New South Wales parliaments by term
19th-century Australian politicians